Djugu is a town in the Ituri Province of the Democratic Republic of the Congo. It is the administrative headquarters of Djugu Territory. 
As of 2012 the population was estimated at 28,061.

References

Populated places in Ituri Province